The Mid-Atlantic music scene consists of mostly unsigned bands from Delaware, Maryland, New Jersey, Pennsylvania, Virginia, Washington, D.C., North Carolina, South Carolina, and West Virginia. However, there have been some success stories of bands that worked hard over the years to achieve commercial success such as Jimmie's Chicken Shack, Good Charlotte, SR-71, and Nothingface.

Every year at the HFStival, the concert features a local music stage which was started and initially run by the influential, but now defunct, regional indie label Fowl Records. Many of the artists from the Mid-Atlantic Music Scene have showcased their talents on this stage.

Clubs and venues
As the Mid-Atlantic music scene is vast for the amount of land and genres of music covered, the venues that support the unsigned bands on their road to fame do their part by opening their doors and giving them the opportunity. All the while, the venues still make their quotas by bringing in the bigger names to pay the bills.  Some of the more notable venues are the Bottle & Cork in Delaware, the recently revamped 8 by 10 in the Federal Hill area of Baltimore, and Fletchers in the Fells Point part of town; also Radio DJ Matt Davis of 98 Rock's (97.9 FM – WIYY) hosts Noise in the Basement. It is a night of networking for bands to perform and see others perform on Monday nights. The capacity of the club is about 250 persons upstairs for concerts.

Maryland
In Towson, Maryland, a suburb of Baltimore, the Recher Theatre used to play host to a larger crowd of 800 persons but closed in 2013. National, regional and local bands performed here, but generally the venue was for bands that have a larger fanbase. The Ottobar, located in the Charles Village neighborhood of Baltimore, is slightly smaller, but also showcases national, regional and local bands.

A much newer member of the music venue family for this scene is the former warehouse space that is now Sonar Lounge, or just "Sonar" to the club goers. Most local acts perform on the small concert side stage which has hosted larger named talent, such as former members of the Wu-Tang Clan.

New Jersey
Asbury Park, New Jersey offers a variety of venues, including the Stone Pony, The Saint, and Asbury Lanes.

North Carolina
In North Carolina, there is an annual event that highlights the talent throughout the whole region usually held during the fall season, October / November entitled the Midatlantic Music Conference .  There have been over 550 performers throughout the years and many big name producers, labels and artists have graced the stages.

Pennsylvania
In Pennsylvania, Tuesday night is home to a local music showcase at the Grape Street Pub in Manayunk. To the west outside of the town of Hershey, Shakey's has been known to showcase local music, especially during the Millennium Music Conference and The Chameleon Club in Lancaster, PA is a staple of the national and regional touring circuit.

Virginia
In Virginia, another venue that contributes to the music scene as well as played host to controversial artist Vanilla Ice as a regular is Jaxx, in Springfield. A slight distance down the road is the Fairfax bar TT Reynold's. Crossing back over the Potomac river into Washington D.C., is the historic 9:30 Club.

Independent record labels
DCide
Fowl Records
Severn Records

Bands
The following are some examples of bands and artists in the Mid-Atlantic.

Maryland
All Time Low- Towson
Alternate Seduction – Baltimore
Circle of Fire – Bel Air/Baltimore
Clutch (band) – Germantown
The Cheaters – Annapolis
The Dance Party – College Park
The Dangerous Summer- Ellicott City
Dog Fashion Disco- Rockville 
Future Islands- Baltimore
Good Charlotte – Annapolis/Waldorf
Jarflys – Annapolis
Jepetto- Annapolis
Jimmie's Chicken Shack – Annapolis
Lake Trout – Baltimore
Live Alien Broadcast – Baltimore/Annapolis
Laughing Colors – Baltimore/Washington D.C.
Lennex – Lead singer Phil Ritchie's band from Ocean City. Phil was seen on CBS's Rock Star: Supernova.
Lower Dens – Baltimore
Niki Barr – Denton
Margret Heater – Baltimore
Mary Prankster – Baltimore
MDHC – Ocean City
Nothingface – Baltimore
Of a Revolution (O.A.R.) – Rockville
Pigeons Playing Ping Pong – Baltimore
The Seldon Plan – Baltimore
The Skunks (ska band)- Hyattsville/Washington D.C.
Sons Of The Radio – Laurel
SR-71- Baltimore
Wye Oak – Baltimore

Pennsylvania
 August Burns Red – Lancaster
 Carfax Abbey 
 Halestorm – York

Virginia
The Friday Night Boys – Northern Virginia
Sev – Fairfax
Lamb of God – Richmond
Windhand – Richmond

District of Columbia
51 Peg
gODHEAD
The Pietasters
You, Me, and Everyone We Know

References

External links
Baltimore Bands Website
Harford County Bands/Bel Air Bash Website
Music Monthly Magazine
Origivation Magazine
Syphrus Music Forum
The Doctors Office – Baltimore & Harrisburg Based Website
King Belvedere

Music of Washington, D.C.
Music of Virginia
Music scenes
Music of Baltimore
Mid-Atlantic culture